Margot Moles (12 October 1913 – 19 August 1987) was a Spanish multisport player who practiced hockey, swimming, skiing and pioneer at the beginning of Spanish women's athletics.  She also competed in the women's combined Alpine skiing at the 1936 Winter Olympics being the first Spanish female to participate in a Winter Olympic Games with Ernestina Maenza.

References

External links
 

1913 births
1987 deaths
Spanish female alpine skiers
Olympic alpine skiers of Spain
Alpine skiers at the 1936 Winter Olympics
Sportspeople from Terrassa
Spanish female discus throwers
Spanish female hammer throwers